Hilde Schneider (1914–1961) was a German actress. She appeared in the 1939 film Shoulder Arms.

Selected filmography
 The Schimeck Family (1935)
 Hilde and the Volkswagen (1936)
 There Were Two Bachelors (1936)
 Silence of the Forest (1937)
 Bachelor's Paradise (1939)
 Shoulder Arms (1939)

References

Bibliography 
 Richards, Jeffrey. Visions of Yesterday. Routledge & Kegan, 1973.

External links 
 

1914 births
1961 deaths
German stage actresses
German film actresses
People from Baden-Baden
20th-century German actresses